Sadau Kiatsongrit (also written as Suadao) otherwise known as Sadau Por.Pisitchet is a Thai Muay Thai kickboxer who used to fight many foreign kickboxers in K-1 events.

Athletic career
Sadau ("leopard") is the second fighter after Changpuek Kiatsongrit, which his stable (Kiatsongrit gym) determined to raise up to be a Thai kickboxer in the heaviest weight class that fights with foreign kickboxers in the international level.

On April 26, 1992, in a special event of popular promoter Songchai Rattanasuban at Rajpracha Samasai School, Phra Pradaeng, Samut Prakan, at the age of 25, he defeated the Dutch legend Rob Kaman by unanimous decision through a total of five rounds.

In 1993 he TD (doctor stopped the contest) Mennis Luc Verheijen a hot-tempered kickboxer from Belgium with right elbow in the fourth round.

As a result he won unanimously 50-46, 50-46, 50-46 after five rounds.

Sadau Kiatsongrit had versus with many top-line fighters such as Andy Hug, Stefan Leko, Mike Bernardo, Stan Longinidis etc.

Titles
World Muaythai Council (WMC)
 1996 WMC Cruiserweight World Champion (190 lb)
 1992 WMTC World -75kg Champion
Lumpinee Stadium
 Lumpinee Stadium Welterweight Champion

Fight record

|-  style="background:#FFBBBB;"
| 1999-08-22|| Loss ||align=left| Teng Jun || K-1 Spirits '99 || Tokyo, Japan || Decision (Unanimous) || 3 || 3:00
|-  style="background:#FFBBBB;"
| 1998-10-28|| Loss ||align=left| Mike Bernardo || K-1 Kamikaze '98 || Tokyo, Japan || TKO (Corner Stoppage) || 1 || 2:00
|-  style="background:#fbb;"
| 1997-10-12 || Loss||align=left| Shuji Abe || MAJKF || Tokyo, Japan || Decision || 5 || 3:00
|-  style="background:#FFBBBB;"
| 1997-09-07|| Loss ||align=left| Curtis Schuster || K-1 World GP 1997 Opening || Osaka, Japan || Decision (Majority) || 3 || 3:00
|-  style="background:#FFBBBB;"
| 1997-04-29|| Loss ||align=left| Stefan Leko || K-1 Braves '97 || Fukuoka, Japan || Decision (Unanimous) || 5 || 3:00
|-  style="background:#CCFFCC;"
| 1996-07-20 || Win ||align=left| Musashi ||  || Buriram, Thailand || Decision || 5 || 3:00
|-
! style=background:white colspan=9 |
|-  style="background:#FFBBBB;"
| 1996-06-02 || Loss ||align=left| Andy Hug || K-1 Fight Night II || Zurich, Switzerland || KO (Right Hook)  || 2 || 3:00
|-  style="background:#FFBBBB;"
| 1996-03-10 || Loss||align=left| Stan Longinidis || K-1 Grand Prix '96 Opening Battle || Yokohama, Japan || Ext.R Decision || 6 || 3:00 
|-
|- style="background:#CCFFCC;"
| 1993-00-00 || Win ||align=left| Mennis Luc Verheijen || || Thailand || TKO (Right Elbow) || 4 || 
|-  bgcolor="#cfc"
| 1992 || Win ||align=left| Perry Ubeda || || Thailand || ||  || 
|-
! style=background:white colspan=9 |
|-  bgcolor="#cfc"
| 1992-04-26 || Win||align=left| Rob Kaman || || Phra Pradaeng, Thailand || Decision || 5 || 3:00
|-
| colspan=9 | Legend:

References

Living people
1967 births
Thai male Muay Thai practitioners
Cruiserweight kickboxers
Heavyweight kickboxers
Light heavyweight kickboxers